Peggy's Cove Preservation Area is a preservation area and community enacted by the Nova Scotia government to preserve the unique scenic beauty, character and atmosphere of Peggy's Cove for the enjoyment of both residents and visitors within Peggy's Cove Nova Scotia mandated by the Peggy's Cove Commission Act.
The area includes the Swissair Flight 111 memorial site at Whalesback.

References 
 Peggy's Cove Commission Act
 Peggy's Cove Preservation Area
  Explore HRM

Communities in Halifax, Nova Scotia
General Service Areas in Nova Scotia